Morgan Valentine Spurlock (born November 7, 1970) is an American documentary filmmaker, humorist, television producer, screenwriter and playwright.

Spurlock's films include Super Size Me (2004), Where in the World Is Osama bin Laden? (2008), POM Wonderful Presents: The Greatest Movie Ever Sold (2011), Comic-Con Episode IV: A Fan's Hope (2011), One Direction: This Is Us (2013) and Super Size Me 2: Holy Chicken! (2017). He was the executive producer and star of the reality television series 30 Days (2005–2008). In June 2013, Spurlock became host and producer of the CNN show Morgan Spurlock Inside Man (2013–2016). He is also the co-founder of short-film content marketing company Cinelan, which produced the Focus Forward campaign for GE.

Biography

Early life
Morgan Valentine Spurlock was born on November 7, 1970 in Parkersburg, West Virginia, and was raised in Beckley, West Virginia. His parents, Ben and Phyllis Spurlock, raised him as a Methodist.  He has said he is of Scots-Irish and English descent.

Education
Spurlock was educated at Woodrow Wilson High School, a public high school in the city of Beckley, West Virginia. He graduated with a BFA in film from New York University's Tisch School of the Arts in 1993. He is a member of the fraternity Phi Gamma Delta.

Later life
Before making the 2004 Academy Award-nominated Super Size Me, Spurlock was a playwright, winning awards for his play The Phoenix at both the New York International Fringe Festival in 1999 and the Route 66 American Playwriting Competition in 2000.

He also created I Bet You Will for MTV. I Bet You Will began as a popular Internet webcast of five-minute episodes featuring ordinary people doing stunts in exchange for money. Examples include eating a full jar of mayonnaise (US$235), eating a "worm burrito" (US$265), and taking shots of corn oil, Pepto-Bismol, lemon juice, hot sauce, cold chicken broth, and cod liver oil (US$450.00 for all nine shots). The webcast was a success, with over a million hits in the first five days. MTV later bought and aired the show, which Spurlock hosted. The list of documentary films that inspired Spurlock includes Brother's Keeper, Hoop Dreams, The Thin Blue Line, Roger and Me, Harlan County USA, and The Last Waltz. He considers Brother's Keeper the greatest documentary of all time. In 2008, he signed a deal with Fox Television Studios.

While attending a screening of the movie Catfish, Spurlock approached the film's producers afterwards and called Catfish "the best fake documentary" he had ever seen.

In 2017, Spurlock stepped down from his production company after admitting to having committed sexual misconduct in his past, including cheating on his past wives and girlfriends as well as settling a sexual harassment allegation.

Film

Super Size Me

Spurlock's docudrama Super Size Me was released in the U.S. on May 7, 2004. This production was later nominated for the Academy Award for Best Documentary Feature and Spurlock won the first Writers Guild of America Award for Best Documentary Screenplay. He conceived the idea for the film when he was at his parent's house for Thanksgiving, and while watching TV saw a news story about a lawsuit brought against McDonald's by two teenage girls who blamed the fast food chain for their obesity.

The film depicts an experiment he conducted in 2003, in which he ate three McDonald's meals a day every day (and nothing else) for 30 days. The film's title derives from one of the rules of Spurlock's experiment: he would not refuse the "super-size" option whenever it was offered to him but would never ask for it himself. The result, according to Spurlock, was a diet with twice the calories recommended by the USDA. Further, Spurlock attempted to curtail his physical activity to match the exercise habits better of the average American (he previously walked about 5 kilometers\3 miles a day, whereas the average American walks 2 kilometers\1.5 miles).

In his reply documentary Fat Head, Tom Naughton "suggests that Spurlock's calorie and fat counts don't add up" and noted Spurlock's refusal to publish the Super Size Me food log. The Houston Chronicle reports: "Unlike Spurlock, Naughton has a page on his Web site that lists every item (including nutritional information) he ate during his fast-food month."

He was of above average health and fitness when he started the project; he gained 25 pounds (11 kg), became quite puffy, and suffered liver dysfunction and depression by the end. Spurlock's supervising physicians noted the effects caused by his high-calorie diet—once even comparing it to a case of severe binge alcoholism. Following Spurlock's December 2017 assertion that he hadn't been "sober for more than a week" in three decades, the claims of his liver dysfunction being caused by eating McDonald's food solely for 30 days have been called into question. 

After completing the project, it took Spurlock fourteen months to return to his normal weight of 185 pounds (84 kg).  His then-girlfriend (now ex-wife), Alexandra Jamieson, took charge of his recovery with her "detox diet", which became the basis for her book, The Great American Detox Diet.

Spurlock released a sequel film, Super Size Me 2: Holy Chicken!, in 2017, to be distributed by YouTube Red, but was dropped since Spurlock's admission of sexual misconduct. Samuel Goldwyn Films distributed the film, instead, in September 2019.

Subsequent films

Spurlock's second feature documentary, Where in the World Is Osama Bin Laden? premiered at the Sundance Film Festival in January 2008. In the film, and in interviews, Spurlock explores the fight against terrorism and views the argument from both sides, in which he tries to find Osama Bin Laden.

Spurlock directed The Simpsons 20th Anniversary Special – In 3-D! On Ice!.

Freakonomics is an adaptation of the book of the same name by Steven D. Levitt and Stephen J. Dubner, which premiered in April 2010. Spurlock was at the helm of this project alongside five directors (Heidi Ewing, Rachel Grady, Alex Gibney, Seth Gordon and Eugene Jarecki).

The one-hour documentary Committed: The Toronto International Film Festival premiered on AMC on 12 October 2010.

The Greatest Movie Ever Sold is a 2011 documentary film about product placement, marketing and advertising which was reportedly itself financed through product placement. The Greatest Movie Ever Sold was shown at the Sundance Film Festival in January 2011. It was released in the US in April 2011. It screened in the New Zealand Film Festival in August 2011 together with an appearance by Spurlock to talk about the movie.

In mid-2010, Spurlock worked with Buffy the Vampire Slayer creator Joss Whedon, Ain't It Cool News founder Harry Knowles, and comic book creator Stan Lee to create the documentary Comic-Con Episode Four: A Fan's Hope, to cover the stories of convention fans. Whedon, Lee, and Knowles served as executive producers. Legendary Pictures' Thomas Tull, who independently financed the documentary, told Variety, "We look forward to capturing the spirit, energy and people that Comic-Con has infused into legions of fans, bringing these audiences and projects out of the halls and onto a world stage." On April 6, 2012, Spurlock released the film to selected theaters in the United States, as well as video on demand outlets.

Spurlock hosted and produced the CNN series Morgan Spurlock Inside Man, which aired from June 2013 to August 2016.

Spurlock helped distribute A Brony Tale, a documentary directed by Brent Hodge on the brony phenomenon and on the musician and voice acting career of Ashleigh Ball. The film was selected for theatrical distribution under the label Morgan Spurlock Presents. The film had a July 8, 2014 theater release.

Spurlock teamed up with Hodgee Films again on the 2015 series Consider the Source, in association with Disney's Maker Studios.

30 Days

In each episode, a person (sometimes Spurlock himself) or a group of people spend 30 days immersing themselves in a mode of life markedly different from their norm (being in prison, a devout Christian living in a Muslim family, a homophobe staying with a homosexual person, etc.), while Spurlock discusses the relevant social issues involved. FX began airing the show on June 15, 2005. In the premiere episode of the first season, "Minimum Wage", Spurlock and his fiancée lived for 30 days in the Bottoms neighborhood of Columbus, Ohio, earning minimum wage, with no access to outside funds.

In the second-season finale, Spurlock spent 25 days locked in a Henrico County, Virginia (a county outside of Richmond), jail to experience life as an inmate. He did not complete the entire 30 days in jail because the majority of inmates in the state of Virginia serve 85% of the sentence, so once Spurlock reached that benchmark, he was released.

The third season of 30 Days premiered on June 3, 2008.

In late 2008, FX announced it would not renew the 30 Days series, making the third season the last.

Other work

 Spurlock optioned the rights for Chris Mooney's book The Republican War on Science in order to create another documentary film, but released the option in 2008.
 Spurlock has a role in the film Drive Thru, a horror film about a fictional fast food restaurant that has its mascot come to life and start killing people. It was released on DVD on May 29, 2007.
 Spurlock presented 50 Documentaries to See Before You Die on Current TV. The show premiered on August 1, 2011.
 On May 28, 2011, Spurlock was the graduation commencement speaker for the MBA Business program at Sonoma State University.
 Spurlock's half-hour documentary series A Day in the Life was to debut on  Hulu in mid-August 2011. It follows "incredibly focused" people such as  Richard Branson and will.i.am for a full day. The series is exclusive to Hulu.
 Spurlock directed an additional episode of ESPN's 30 for 30 sports documentary series, entitled "The Dotted Line".  This documentary takes a look at the competitive world of sports agents. "The Dotted Line" premiered on ESPN October 11, 2011, one day following the premiere of a two-hour documentary, I, Caveman, created and directed by Spurlock for the Science Channel series Curiosity. In it, a group of men and women including Spurlock try to survive in the wild using only Stone Age technology.
In 2011, Spurlock presented a Ted talk called "The greatest Ted talk ever sold".
 Spurlock is the presenter of a new show in the UK on Sky Atlantic entitled Morgan Spurlock's New Britannia. The show is a comedy based around the differences between the UK and the US.
 Spurlock contributed a brief Foreword to Martin Lindstrom's 2011 book Brandwashed.
 Spurlock's documentary Mansome was announced on March 8, 2012 as a Spotlight selection for the Tribeca Film Festival. The film takes a comedic look at male identity as defined through men's grooming habits featuring celebrity and expert commentary.
 Spurlock directed the 3D concert film One Direction: This Is Us, starring the English-Irish boy band One Direction, and released August 30, 2013 by TriStar Pictures.
 Spurlock wrote a book in 2005 as a follow-up to Super Size Me entitled Don't Eat This Book: Fast Food and the Supersizing of America.
 Spurlock has a chapter giving advice in Tim Ferriss' book Tools of Titans.

Personal life
Spurlock has two sons. The older, Laken James Spurlock, was born on December 9, 2006. His birth is depicted in Spurlock's documentary Where in the World Is Osama bin Laden?, which Spurlock dedicated to Laken. The younger, Kallen Marcus Spurlock, was born on May 22, 2016.

Although Spurlock was raised Methodist, he stated in an interview with TV Guide in 2014 that he is now agnostic.

Sexual misconduct incidents
In December 2017, Spurlock wrote a blog post admitting to a history of sexual misconduct. After publishing his blog post, he stepped down from his position with Warrior Poets, a company he had founded in 2004. 

In October 2022, The Washington Post reported that Spurlock had "suffered career death" as a result of his misconduct.

Bibliography

Filmography

Films

Television

References

External links

 
 
 "10 Questions for Morgan Spurlock" at Time
 Morgan Spurlock judged The Film of the Month competition in February 2009 on the independent filmmakers networking site Shooting People.
 Morgan Spurlock talks The Greatest Movie Ever Sold, Sundance 2011 – interview conducted by IndieWire
 Theodora & Callum Interview with Morgan Spurlock

1970 births
Film directors from West Virginia
Film directors from New York (state)
American agnostics
American former Protestants
American people of English descent
American people of Scotch-Irish descent
American documentary film directors
Former Methodists
Living people
People from Beckley, West Virginia
People from Parkersburg, West Virginia
Businesspeople from New York City
Sundance Film Festival award winners
Tisch School of the Arts alumni
Woodrow Wilson High School (Beckley, West Virginia) alumni
Writers from New York City
Writers from West Virginia
Writers Guild of America Award winners
Film directors from New York City